The Haifa bus 37 suicide bombing was a suicide bombing carried out on 5 March 2003 on an Egged bus in Haifa, Israel. Seventeen passengers were killed in the attack and 53 were injured. Many of the victims were students from Haifa University.

The Palestinian Islamist militant organization Hamas claimed responsibility for the attack. The suicide bomber was 20-year-old  Mahmoud Umdan Salim Qawasmeh, a student at the Palestine Polytechnic University. An Israeli Arab resident of Haifa who helped plan the attack was also tried and sentenced to life imprisonment for his involvement.

The attack
The attack occurred on 5 March 2003,  when a suicide bomber from Hebron detonated a bomb hidden underneath his clothes on a bus carrying many children and teenagers on their way home from school. The bus exploded as it was pulling out of station on Moriyah Street, a main traffic artery near the Carmeliya neighborhood, heading from the Bat Galim neighborhood to the University of Haifa. The explosion occurred while the bus was packed with commuters. The attack killed 17 people and wounded 53. Police said the bomb, strapped to the bomber's body, was laden with metal shrapnel in order to maximize the number of injuries.

Aftermath 
Spokesmen from Hamas and Islamic Jihad praised the attack. "We will not stop our resistance," said Abd al-Aziz Rantisi of Hamas. "We are not going to give up in the face of the daily killing of Palestinians." In response, Israeli helicopters killed Hamas leader Ibrahim al-Makadmeh and three of his bodyguards.

On 18 October 2011, Israel released three people convicted of planning the attack, Maedh Waal Taleb Abu Sharakh (19 life sentences), Majdi Muhammad Ahmed Amr (19 life sentences) and Fadi Muhammad Ibrahim al-Jaaba (18 life sentences), as part of the Gilad Shalit prisoner exchange.

See also
List of Hamas suicide attacks

References

External links 
Bus bomb Rocks Haifa - published on The Daily Telegraph on 5 March 2003
Deadly bus blast rocks Haifa - published on BBC News on 6 March 2003
Explosion rips through bus, killing at least 15 in Israel ; American among victims; lull in suicide attacks ends  - published on the Boston Globe on 6 March 2003
Memorial site of Liz Katzman 	
Memorial site of Tal Khermann

Mass murder in 2003
Suicide bombings in 2003
Islamic terrorist incidents in 2003
Israeli casualties in the Second Intifada
Terrorist incidents in Israel in 2003
Terrorist incidents in Haifa
March 2003 events in Asia
Hamas suicide bombings of buses
Islamic terrorism in Israel